Nairn Alexander MacEwan (12 December 1941 – 31 May 2018) was a Scottish international rugby player and coach. He played at flanker, and was capped twenty times for Scotland between 1971–75, including a try in the match against  in 1972.

Playing career
MacEwan was born in Dar-es-Salaam, modern Tanzania.

Unusually for a top level Scottish rugby player, MacEwan was a Highlander, and Highland based. As Allan Massie says:

There have been fine players too who missed Lions selection: ... Nairn MacEwan, a great mauler whose enthusiasm for the game was so great that he travelled thousands of miles between his home in Inverness and his club Gala.

MacEwan helped Highland RFC to their "years of glory in the Seventies, when guided and inspired by [him], they shot up through the divisions, but they have since fallen away, and are now a run of the mill Second Division outfit."

Bill McLaren notes that Bill Dickinson included MacEwan in "one of the most formidable packs of all time", alongside the Scottish rugby greats like Ian McLauchlan, Sandy Carmichael, Alistair McHarg, Gordon Brown, Peter Brown and Rodger Arneil. However, once when Scotland played  at Twickenham, England coach John Burgess made the notorious comment,

I've seen this Scottish pack rucking. If it's blood on their boots they want, that's what they'll get.

Nairn MacEwan was taken off the field in this game after only two minutes.

Coaching
MacEwan was succeeded by Jim Telfer.

MacEwan also coached the Italian side Rugby Rovigo.

MacEwan died on 31 May 2018.

References
 Bath, Richard (ed.) (2007). The Scotland Rugby Miscellany. Vision Sports Publishing. .
 McLaren, Bill (1991). Talking of Rugby. London: Stanley Paul. .
 Massie, Allan. A Portrait of Scottish Rugby. Edinburgh: Polygon. .

1941 births
2018 deaths
Gala RFC players
Highland RFC players
North and Midlands players
Scotland international rugby union players
Scotland national rugby union team coaches
Scottish rugby union coaches
Scottish rugby union players
People from Dar es Salaam